Dashiin Damba (March 29, 1908 – 1989) was a Mongolian politician who was elected General Secretary of the Mongolian People’s Revolutionary Party (MPRP) in 1954.   He was ousted from office in 1958 and banished to internal exile a year later for his strong backing of de-Stalinization policies against the wishes of Mongolia’s Prime Minister Yumjaagiin Tsedenbal.

Early life

Mongolian Revolutionary Youth League

Damba was born on March 29, 1908, in Daiching Zasag banner (present day Teshig Sum, Bulgan Province). He joined the highly radicalized Mongolian Revolutionary Youth League (MYRL) in 1924,  quickly rising to leadership positions first at local district levels then in Ulaanbaatar.   From 1929 to 1930, he directed MYRL “shock troops” carrying out MPRP policies of rapid collectivization of small herders and the confiscation and redistribution of property belonging to the country’s nobles.

Political Commissar

Damba officially joined the MPRP in 1930 and graduated from the party school in Ulaanbaatar in 1932. He was appointed Political commissar in the Mongolian People's Army and propagandized to government troops fighting armed insurgencies in Khövsgöl, Arkhangai, Övörkhangai, and Zavkhan provinces.

Political career

In 1938 he was elected provincial party secretary of the MPRP in Ömnögovi Province and a year later became a member of the MPRP Presidium and Secretary of the Ulaanbaatar MPRP Central Committee.

Role in Stalinist repressions

As the violent Stalinist repressions in Mongolia drew to a close in 1939, Mongolia’s leader Khorloogiin Choibalsan recruited Damba to assist in the arrest and rendition to the Soviet Union of Deputy Interior Minister Darizavyn Losol, one of the last remaining founding members of the MPRP.  Damba deceived Losol into boarding a plane he believed was bound for Dornod Province in eastern Mongolia.  Losol was instead flown to Moscow. In 1940, Damba was involved in another high-profile arrest, this time of MPRP First Secretary Banzarjavyn Baasanjav whom Choibalsan sought to have purged to make way for Stalin’s new favorite Tsedenbal. Damba was named MPRP First Secretary for just two months in 1940, effectively a place holder until Tsedenbal could ascend to the role. Despite his services to Choibalsan, Damba never managed to become part of Mongolian leader's inner circle.

Member of the MPRP Politburo

During the Second World War Damba was instrumental in organizing Mongolian aid for the Soviet Army, and was later awarded the Soviet Order of the Red Banner of Labour for his efforts.  He was elected to the MPRP Politburo in 1943 and again in 1947.  From 1947 to 1954 he served as Second Secretary of the MPRP Central Committee under Tsedenbal.

First Secretary of the MPRP

Collective leadership

After Choibalsan’s death in 1952, the MPRP, following the example of the Communist Party in the USSR following Stalin’s death, moved to devolve political power away from a single strongman and instead institute a system of collective leadership.  Delegates at the Twelfth MPRP Congress in 1954 elected Damba to replace Tsedenbal as First Secretary of MPRP, while Tsedenbal retained the post of Prime Minister.   

Damba’s tenure as party secretary saw the establishment of  formal diplomatic relations with India in 1955, the first time a non-communist country recognized Mongolia’s independence.   Relations with China also improved considerably, especially after Damba met personally with Mao Zedong in September 1956 in Beijing to discuss Chinese aid to Mongolia.  When relations between the two countries deteriorated a year later, Damba would be accused of being too “pro-Chinese.”

De-Stalinization

In 1956, with de-Stalinization unfolding in the Soviet Union,  the MPRP embarked on a similar policy in Monoglia, producing the first public denunciation of Marshal Choibalsan. The deceased dictator was criticized for committing "errors" against socialist principles, including his role in the repressions and the establishment of his cult of personality, and a special commission was formed to reevaluate purge victims in the Stalin-Choibalsan years. While Damba supported giving the commission access to top-secret Interior Ministry files on the purges, Tsedenbal, a former protégé of Choibalsan, was opposed to continuing de-Stalinization efforts.   When in 1957 Tsedenbal planned to arrest the Commission’s Chairman Bazaryn Shirendev and another rival as "imperialist spies," Damba persuaded him to delay and then drop the charges.

Removal from office

The Soviet-educated Tsedenbal viewed Damba as "backward," lazy, and uneducated.  He engineered Damba's removal from office in November 1958, just six months after the Thirteenth MPRP congress had reelected him to the position. Taking a cue from Nikita Khrushchev’s 1957 consolidation of power in the USSR by purging political rivals Georgy Malenkov and Nikolai Bulganin, Tsedenbal accused Damba of “profound ideological-political backwardness, conservatism and inertia” and “opportunist tolerance of distortions and shortcomings.” Just over a year later, in November 1959, Damba was sent into internal exile and demoted to director of the Ikh-Uul district animal husbandry machinery station in remote Khövsgöl Province.  In 1962 Damba became deputy director of the  Institute of Agriculture, a position he held until 1977.

Death

The circumstances around his death are unknown, however he is believed to have died 1989. In 1990 the MPRP Central Committee declared the charges against him unfounded and in 2008, Sükhbaatar district court declared him a victim of the repression.

Notes 

1908 births
1989 deaths
Mongolian communists
Mongolian People's Party politicians
People from Bulgan Province